Kuhak is a 1960 Bengali romance drama film directed by Agradoot and starring Uttam Kumar and Sabitri Chatterjee in lead roles. This film portrays a man's struggle to run blindly after riches.

Cast 
 Uttam Kumar  as Sunando Chowdhury (Thief)
 Sabitri Chatterjee as Swarnalata (Ganesh's Sister)
 Tulsi Chakraborty as Adhikary
 Kamal Mitra as BK Roy
 Tarun Kumar as Ganesh (Thief)
 Gangapada Bose as Ananto Khuro
 Premanghsu Bose as Gokul
 Preeti Majumdar 
 Master Dipak as Hiru
 Master Sushanta as Chhoton

Soundtrack
All songs were composed and sunf by Hemanta Mukherjee and penned by Gauriprasanna Majumdar.
"Aro Kache Eso" - Hemanta Mukherjee
"Bishnupriya Go Ami Chole Jai" - Hemanta Mukherjee
"Hay Hanpay Je Ei Hapor" - Hemanta Mukherjee
"Naolo Kishori Go" - Hemanta Mukherjee
'Peyechhi Parash Manik" - Hemanta Mukherjee
"Sarati Din Dhore" - Hemanta Mukherjee

References

External links
 

Bengali-language Indian films
1960 films
Indian black-and-white films
1960s Bengali-language films
Indian drama films